Dogbone Lake is a lake in North Slope Borough, Alaska, in the United States.

Dogbone Lake is shaped like a dog bone, hence the name.

See also
List of lakes in Alaska

References

Lakes of Alaska
Bodies of water of North Slope Borough, Alaska